The 23rd Alabama Sharpshooter Battalion was a sharpshooter battalion of the Confederate States Army during the American Civil War. The battalion was formed on November 25, 1863 at Charleston, Tennessee from three companies of the 1st Infantry Battalion, Hilliard's Alabama Legion.

Service
The 23rd Alabama Sharpshooter Battalion served in Gracie's Alabama Brigade in the Department of East Tennessee in late 1863, before being transferred to the Department of Richmond in time for the Bermuda Hundred Campaign . It later served with the Army of Northern Virginia from the Siege of Petersburg to the surrender at Appomattox Courthouse on April 9, 1865.

See also
List of Alabama Civil War Confederate units

Notes

References
 Lewellyn A. Shaver History of the Sixtieth Alabama Regiment, Gracie's Alabama Brigade
 Stewart Sifakis. Compendium of the Confederate Armies: Alabama. Facts on File, NY 1992 

Units and formations of the Confederate States Army from Alabama
Sharpshooter units and formations of the American Civil War